Tossens is a village on the Butjadingen peninsula in Germany, in the Bundesland of Niedersachsen.

It effectively consists of two areas: the tourist section on the coastline of Jadebusen bay; and the original village which is further inshore.

In the village is the Warft church of St. Bartholomäus.

Tossens is also the location of Center Parcs Butjadinger Küste resort.

References

Villages in Lower Saxony